When a white horse is not a horse is a paradox in Chinese philosophy attributed to Gongsun Long, a philosopher of the Warring States period. It appears in the form of a dialogue between two unnamed speakers who debate the proposition "a white horse is not a horse".

The original text
The dialogue constitutes a chapter of the eponymous Gongsun Longzi. The purported author, also known as "Master Gongsun Long" (fl. 284-259 BCE), was counted among the School of Names in the Hundred Schools of Thought. Most of Gongsun's writings have been lost; the received Gongsun Longzi text contains only six of the supposed 14 original chapters. Parts of the text are dislocated; thus, some commentators and translators rearrange them for clarity. The dialogue is between two unnamed speakers:

This dialogue continues with deliberations over colored and colorless horses and whether white and horse can be separated from white horse.

Other Gongsun Longzi chapters discuss "white horse"-related concepts of: jian  'hard; hardness', and bai  'white; whiteness', ming  'name; term', shi  'solid; true, actual; fact, reality', the abstract zhi  'finger; pointing; designation; universal' (like "whiteness"), and the concrete wu  'thing; object; particular' (like "a white horse").

Interpretations and proposed solutions
The 'paradox' can be resolved by recognizing that the lack of articles in the Chinese language contributes to semantic ambiguity. Without grammatical articles, it is unclear whether each 'horse' in the statement "A white horse is not a horse" refers to 'a horse', 'the (desired) horse', 'all horses', or 'horsekind'. This can be seen clearly by expressing the paradox in English using articles: suppose that one desires yellow or black horses, then a white horse would not be the (desired) horse. The Advocate's sophistry in the White Horse Dialogue is due to his confounding 'a horse' with 'the (desired) horse'.

According to A. C. Graham, this  "A white horse is not a horse" paradox plays upon the ambiguity of whether the 'is' in the statement means:
 "Is a member of the class "; or
 "Is identical to ".

In other words, the expression "white horse is not horse" is ambiguous between "white horse is not synonymous with horse" (true because white horse is more specific than horse), versus "a white horse is not a member of the set of horses" (obviously false). The Advocate in the dialogue is asserting a lack of identity between horses and white horses, while the Objector is interpreting the Advocate's statement as a claim that the category of horses does not include white ones.

Beyond the inherent semantic ambiguities of "A white horse is not a horse," the first line of the White Horse Dialogue obscurely asks  ('Can it be that ...?'). This dialogue could be an attempted proof that a white horse is not a horse, or a question if such a statement is possible, or both. Bryan W. Van Norden suggests that "the Advocate is only arguing that 'a white horse is not a horse'  be true, given a certain interpretation. He might acknowledge that, in another interpretation, 'a white horse  a horse.

An alternative interpretation is offered in Feng Youlan's A History of Chinese Philosophy:

However, there are recent histories of Chinese philosophy that do not subscribe to Feng's interpretation. Other contemporary philosophers and sinologists who have analyzed the dialogue include A. C. Graham, Chad Hansen, Cristoph Harbsmeier, Kirill Ole Thompson, and Bryan W. Van Norden.

Historic influence

In the Chinese philosophical tradition, the White Horse Dialogue's significance is evident from the number of Chinese classic texts directly or indirectly discussing it. The Liezi, which lists and criticizes the paradoxes of Gongsun Long as "perversions of reason and sense", explains "'A white horse is not a horse' because the name diverges from the shape."

Two Zhuangzi chapters (17 and 33) mock Gongsun Long, and another (2) combines his zhi  'attribute' and ma  'horse' notions in the same context:

The Mengzi (6A4) notes that bai  'white' has different connotations whether one is using it to refer to a graying person (who is worthy of respect because of his or her age) or a white horse (which should be treated like any other animal):

Other early "a white horse is not a horse" references are found in the Hanfeizi (32), Mozi (11B), and Zhanguoce (4).

See also
Use–mention distinction

Notes

References
 
 
 
 
 
 
 
 
 
 
  (Includes a section titled "On the White Horse".)

External links
  "The White Horse Dialogue", CText.org, Chinese Text Project

Dialogues
Horses in culture
Philosophical paradoxes
Chinese philosophy
Horses in China